ALK or Alk may refer to:

 ALK Airlines, a Bulgarian charter airline
 Anaplastic lymphoma kinase, a human gene
 Alk-, a root word used in organic chemistry
 Alaska Air Group ticker symbol
 Aslockton railway station, Nottinghamshire, England,  National Rail code
 ALK or ALK-Abelló, a Danish pharmaceutical company
 Automated lamellar keratoplasty, a type of eye surgery
Alk, Albania, a village
 Alk, Iran, a village in Kurdistan Province
 Alk-e Kohneh ("Old Alk"), a village in Kurdistan Province, Iran
 , a German cargo ship in service 1928–45
 A sailing ship renamed as Albatross
 ALK, the ICAO Code for SriLankan Airlines

See also
 ALK1-7, an activin receptor-like kinase protein e.g. ALK1